PIATS (Product Identification, Authentication and Tracking System) is a barcoding system, mainly used in China.

PIATS barcode printing requirements
 A unique variable barcode printed or applied onto each primary/secondary package.
 Barcode type: UCC/EAN 128 (Multi) of 20 numbers, AI (Application Identifier)=21
 Density: >=7 mils, 10 mils is recommended. 
 Code length=28 mm under 7 mils
 Code length=42.5 mm under 10 mils
 Bar height: >=8 mm
 Grade: >C (1.5)
 Quiet zone: >=1.5 mm for each zone

Note: 
 The AI value is not shown in the human readable data.
 The human readable number is split into 4 groups as above to make it easier for human reading.

Types of commodities listed in PIATS legislation
Household appliances
Floor
Cable and wire
Fertilizer
Gas oven
Personal protective equipment
Electric heating under blanket
Food (including beverage, dairy)
Cosmetics

Each category includes more than one sub-category, totally 69 types of commodities.

Where to print or apply PIATS barcode
 Compulsory on primary packaging of the above 9 categories, or can be compromised onto secondary packaging if technology is limited. The latter is applicable only to dairy, beverage and cosmetics sectors at the moment.
 Compulsory on secondary packaging without compromise
 Option on tertiary packaging if commodity producer is willing to print or apply.

How to code PIATS barcode onto packaging
 Directly printing barcode on packaging in line with production facilities
 Pre-print PIATS label and then apply it on packaging

External links
PIATS website (Chinese only)

Barcodes